Mioeuoticus is an extinct genus of lorisid primates from the Miocene of East Africa. It is the only genus in the subfamily Mioeuoticinae. Mioeuoticus was a relatively small, potto-sized animal with an omnivorous diet consisting of fruit and insects.

Species 
 M. bishopi 
 M. kichotoi 
 M. shipmani

References 

Lorises and galagos
Prehistoric strepsirrhines
Prehistoric primate genera
Burdigalian genus first appearances
Langhian genus extinctions
Miocene primates of Africa
Fossils of Kenya
Fossils of Uganda
Fossil taxa described in 1962